Framo may refer to:

 Framo AS, a Norwegian supplier of submerged cargo pumps
 Framo (car), a former German automobile brand

People with the surname Framo
James Framo (1922–2001), American family therapist